Angel Heart is the seventh album by American singer-songwriter Jimmy Webb, released in April 1982 by Real West Production.

Critical response
In his review for AllMovie, William Ruhlmann described the album as "a classic of the style called 'West Coast pop', a creamy adult contemporary sound with a rock edge but plenty of strings, the tasty guitar solos offset by the sweet harmonies". While Ruhlmann acknowledged that "Webb's days as a struggling vocalist are behind him", he pointed to a unique problem for a Jimmy Webb album—the material. Ruhlmann concluded:

The AllMusic website gave the album three and a half out of five stars.

Track listing

Personnel

Music
 Jimmy Webb – vocals, piano, electric piano 
 Fred Mollin – acoustic guitar, percussion, producer, backing vocals
 Kenny Loggins – backing vocals
 Victor Feldman – percussion
 Daryl Hall – backing vocals on "Nasty Love"
 Fred Tackett – acoustic and electric guitar
 Jerry Hey – trumpet
 David Paich – organ, piano
 David Foster – piano
 Leland Sklar – bass
 Bob Glaub – bass
 Jeff Porcaro – drums
 Dean Cortez – bass
 Graham Nash – backing vocals
 Valerie Carter – backing vocals
 Michael McDonald – backing vocals
 Leah Kunkel – backing vocals
 Stephen Bishop – vocals on "In Cars"
 Steve Lukather – electric guitar
 Bud Shank – flute
 Dean Parks – acoustic and electric guitar
 Gerry Beckley – backing vocals

Production
 Matthew McCauley – arranger, string arrangements, backing vocals, synthesizer, producer, conductor, percussion
 William F. Williams – executive producer
 Nancy Donald – design
 Mark Linett – overdub engineer
 Bob Schaper – engineer
 Mike Reese – mastering
 Dennis Drake – engineer, overdub engineer
 Bob Irwin – reissue producer
 Kevin Boutote – digital mastering
 Bill Schnee – mixing
 Henry Diltz – photography

References

1982 albums
Jimmy Webb albums